This is a list of battles of the Turkish War of Independence. The list does not include battles fought against the rebels and the Ottoman government (for these, see Revolts during the Turkish War of Independence).

See also
 Chanak Crisis
 List of battles involving the Ottoman Empire
 List of Ottoman battles in the 20th century
 List of Ottoman battles in World War I

Turkish War of Independence